Last Days in Havana is a 2016 Cuban drama film directed by Fernando Pérez. It was screened in the Berlinale Special section at the 67th Berlin International Film Festival. In 2017 it won the Havana Star Prize for Best Film (Fiction) at the 18th Havana Film Festival New York.

Cast
 Jorge Martinez
 Gabriela Ramos
 Patricio Wood
 Yailene Sierra

References

External links
 

2016 films
2016 drama films
Cuban drama films
2010s Spanish-language films